Niakaramandougou Department is a department of Hambol Region in Vallée du Bandama District, Ivory Coast. In 2021, its population was 195,127 and its seat is the settlement of Niakaramandougou. The sub-prefectures of the department are Arikokaha, Badikaha, Niakaramandougou, Niédiékaha, Tafiré, and Tortiya.

History
Niakaramandougou Department was created in 2009 as a second-level subdivision via a split-off from Katiola Department. At its creation, it was part of Vallée du Bandama Region.

In 2011, districts were introduced as new first-level subdivisions of Ivory Coast. At the same time, regions were reorganised and became second-level subdivisions and all departments were converted into third-level subdivisions. At this time, Niakaramandougou Department became part of Hambol Region in Vallée du Bandama District.

Notes

Departments of Hambol
States and territories established in 2009
2009 establishments in Ivory Coast